The 1989 Wimbledon Championships was a tennis tournament played on grass courts at the All England Lawn Tennis and Croquet Club in Wimbledon, London in the United Kingdom. It was the 103rd edition of the Wimbledon Championships and were held from 26 June to 9 July 1989.

Prize money
The total prize money for 1989 championships was £3,133,749. The winner of the men's title earned £190,000 while the women's singles champion earned £171,000.

* per team

Champions

Seniors

Men's singles

 Boris Becker defeated  Stefan Edberg, 6–0, 7–6(7–1), 6–4
 It was Becker's 3rd career Grand Slam title and his 3rd and last Wimbledon title.

Women's singles

 Steffi Graf defeated  Martina Navratilova, 6–2, 6–7(1–7), 6–1
 It was Graf's 7th career Grand Slam title and her 2nd Wimbledon title.

Men's doubles

 John Fitzgerald /  Anders Järryd defeated  Rick Leach /  Jim Pugh, 3–6, 7–6(7–4), 6–4, 7–6(7–4)
 It was Fitzgerald's 5th career Grand Slam title and his 1st Wimbledon title. It was Järryd's 5th career Grand Slam title and his 1st Wimbledon title.

Women's doubles

 Jana Novotná /  Helena Suková defeated  Larisa Savchenko /  Natasha Zvereva, 6–1, 6–2
 It was Novotná's 4th career Grand Slam title and her 1st Wimbledon title. It was Suková's 3rd career Grand Slam title and her 2nd Wimbledon title.

Mixed doubles

 Jim Pugh /  Jana Novotná defeated  Mark Kratzmann /  Jenny Byrne, 6–4, 5–7, 6–4
 It was Novotná's 5th career Grand Slam title and her 2nd Wimbledon title. It was Pugh's 3rd career Grand Slam title and his 1st Wimbledon title.

Juniors

Boys' singles

 Nicklas Kulti defeated  Todd Woodbridge, 6–4, 6–3

Girls' singles

 Andrea Strnadová defeated  Meredith McGrath, 6–2, 6–3

Boys' doubles

 Jared Palmer /  Jonathan Stark defeated  John-Laffnie de Jager /  Wayne Ferreira, 7–6(7–4), 7–6(7–2)

Girls' doubles

 Jennifer Capriati /  Meredith McGrath defeated  Andrea Strnadová /  Eva Švíglerová, 6–4, 6–2

Singles seeds

Men's singles
  Ivan Lendl (semifinals, lost to Boris Becker)
  Stefan Edberg (final, lost to Boris Becker)
  Boris Becker (champion)
  Mats Wilander (quarterfinals, lost to John McEnroe)
  John McEnroe (semifinals, lost to Stefan Edberg)
  Jakob Hlasek (first round, lost to Thomas Högstedt)
  Miloslav Mečíř (third round, lost to Slobodan Živojinović)
  Tim Mayotte (quarterfinals, lost to Stefan Edberg)
  Michael Chang (fourth round, lost to Tim Mayotte)
  Jimmy Connors (second round, lost to Dan Goldie)
  Brad Gilbert (first round, lost to John Fitzgerald)
  Kevin Curren (third round, lost to Leif Shiras)
  Aaron Krickstein (fourth round, lost to Boris Becker)
  Andrei Chesnokov (first round, lost to Brad Drewett)
  Mikael Pernfors (second round, lost to Peter Lundgren)
  Amos Mansdorf (fourth round, lost to Stefan Edberg)

Women's singles
  Steffi Graf (champion)
  Martina Navratilova (final, lost to Steffi Graf)
  Gabriela Sabatini (second round, lost to Rosalyn Fairbank)
  Chris Evert (semifinals, lost to Steffi Graf)
  Zina Garrison (second round, lost to Louise Field)
  Helena Suková (fourth round, lost to Catarina Lindqvist)
  Arantxa Sánchez Vicario (quarterfinals, lost to Steffi Graf)
  Pam Shriver (third round, lost to Gretchen Magers)
  Natasha Zvereva (third round, lost to Catarina Lindqvist)
  Jana Novotná (fourth round, lost to Laura Golarsa)
  Monica Seles (fourth round, lost to Steffi Graf)
  Mary Joe Fernández (fourth round, lost to Rosalyn Fairbank)
  Helen Kelesi (first round, lost to Shaun Stafford)
  Hana Mandlíková (fourth round, lost to Martina Navratilova)
  Lori McNeil (fourth round, lost to Arantxa Sánchez Vicario)
  Susan Sloane (second round, lost to Laura Gildemeister)

References

External links
 Official Wimbledon Championships website

 
Wimbledon Championships
Wimbledon Championships
June 1989 sports events in the United Kingdom
July 1989 sports events in the United Kingdom